The Oldest Profession is a 1967 internationally co-produced comedy film. It features contributions from six different film directors, each one doing a segment on prostitution through the ages.

Plot
The Prehistoric Era – the cavewoman Brit is unable to attract a visiting trader until the wall painter Rak has the idea of making up her face.
Roman Nights – in Ancient Rome, the emperor Flavius makes an excuse to leave the empress Domitilla and go with the poet Menippus to a brothel. There he meets a mysterious and beautiful woman who proves to be his wife.
Mademoiselle Mimi – during the French Revolution, Philibert asks to visit Mimi and from her window watches an old aristocrat being guillotined, saying it was his childless uncle. Promising to pay her as soon as the lawyers have settled the estate, he disappears. 
The Gay Nineties – in Paris in the 1890s, Nini goes to bed with a lonely old man and, looking through his wallet once he is asleep, finds he is a partner in a major bank. Refusing to take any money, she says she is in love with him and in the end lets him marry her.
Paris Today –  Catherine, who has lost her driving licence, works from a car driven by her friend Nadia. When the car is impounded, they buy an ambulance instead. One night it is stopped by police, who depart when they discover that the client is a doctor.
Anticipation – in the future, a man from a remote space outpost visits Earth and at the spaceport hotel is offered a prostitute for the night. He rejects the girl, Marlène, as she is ready for action but incapable of conversation. His hosts then find him another girl, Eléonore, who is full of charm and chat but reluctant to go further. He persuades her that the mouth she uses so well could have further uses.

Cast

Prehistoric Era (directed by Franco Indovina)
 Michèle Mercier as Brit
 Enrico Maria Salerno as Rak
 Gabriele Tinti as the trader (as Gabriel Tinti)

Roman Nights (directed by Mauro Bolognini)
 Elsa Martinelli as Domitilla
 Gastone Moschin as Flavius
 Giancarlo Cobelli as Menippus

Mademoiselle Mimi (directed by Phillipe de Broca)
 Jeanne Moreau as Mimi
 Jean-Claude Brialy as Philibert
 Jean Richard as Mimi's previous client
 Jacques Monod as a man in the street

The Gay Nineties (directed by Michael Pfleghar)
 Raquel Welch as Nini
 Martin Held as Édouard 
 Tilly Lauenstein as another prostitute
 Siegfried Schürenberg as another banker

Paris Today (directed by Claude Autant-Lara)
 Nadia Gray as Nadia
 France Anglade as Catherine
 Jacques Duby as a cop
 Francis Blanche as the doctor
 Marcel Dalio as the lawyer Vladimir Leskov

Anticipation (directed by Jean-Luc Godard)
 Jacques Charrier as John Demetrios
 Anna Karina as Eléonore Roméovitch
 Marilù Tolo as Marlène

Production
Raquel Welch was the only American in the cast.

Release
The rights to distribute the film in the US and English-speaking Canada were purchased by Jack Harris. Harris later wrote in his memoirs he was attracted by the chance to work on "a brand new film, produced like a major Hollywood picture, featuring Raquel Welch and some of the hottest female stars in the world... It was a big disappointment as a theatrical entry. However through the years, between theatres, television and home video, it has never lost is popularity and has treated me very well."

The Los Angeles Times thought the film was "ruined by some of the worst dubbing in recent memory".

References

External links

1967 films
West German films
Italian comedy films
1960s French-language films
1967 comedy films
French anthology films
Films directed by Claude Autant-Lara
Films directed by Mauro Bolognini
Films directed by Philippe de Broca
Films directed by Jean-Luc Godard
Films directed by Franco Indovina
Films directed by Michael Pfleghar
Films produced by Horst Wendlandt
Films about prostitution in France
German anthology films
Italian anthology films
Films with screenplays by Jean Aurenche
1960s Italian films